FIFA World Cup qualification is a match that a national association football team takes in order to qualify for the final tournament of the men's FIFA World Cup.

World Cup qualification, or similar terms, may also refer to:

 FIFA World Cup qualification, in association football
 FIFA Women's World Cup qualification, in association football
 Cricket World Cup qualification
 ICC World Cup Qualifier, in cricket
 Women's Cricket World Cup Qualifier
 Rugby World Cup qualification in rugby union